The Ndlovu Youth Choir is a South African musical group founded in 2009.

Their debut studio album Africa (2019) debuted number one in South Africa.

History 
Ndlovu Youth Choir was formed  in January 2009 by  Ndlovu Care Group childcare  community based in 	Elandsdoorn, Limpopo.

In October 2018, they released a single "Shape of You" with South African flautist Wouter Kellerman. The song won Best Independent Music Video at the Hollywood Music Awards.

Towards the end of 2019, they auditioned on  America's Got Talent season 14 and lost the competition on the finalists.

They signed a record deal with  Syco Entertainment joint venture with Sony and began recording their debut 
studio Africa after they returned from America’s Got Talent. 

Their debut studio album Africa was released on November 29, 2019. The album won Best Adult Contemporary Album and debuted number one in South Africa.

Their second album Rise was released on December 11, 2020. 

Their third studio  album Grateful  was released on April 29, 2022. They  collaborated with 25K, Sun-El Musician, Tyler ICU and the National Youth Choirs of Great Britain.

Discography 
 Africa (2019)
 Rise (2020)
 Grateful (2022)

Awards

Hollywood Music Awards 

|-
|2018
|"Shape of You"
|Best Independent Music Video
|

South African Music Awards 

! 
|-
| rowspan="2"|2020
| Africa
| Best Adult Contemporary Album
| 
| 
|-
| Ndlovu Youth Choir 
| International Achievement Award
| 
|

References 

Musical groups established in 2009
2009 establishments in South Africa